Screen Machine Industries, Inc. formerly known as Ohio Central Steel Co., was founded in 1966 originally as a steel fabricating and manufacturing business.  Screen Machine Industries is a manufacturer of portable rock crushers and screening plants for aggregate base, topsoil, compost and green waste materials located in the United States.  Today Screen Machine Industries has its headquarters and manufacturing facility in Etna, Ohio (near Columbus, Ohio).

The company has produced specialized equipment to crush, screen, wash and stockpile aggregate material, topsoil and compost for over 45 years. 

Over the years, Screen Machine Industries has received commendations including the United States Department of Commerce Export Achievement Award in 2006, the Gold Award in 2007 from the Roads & Bridges publication for their "Contractor's Choice Awards", the Governor's Award in 2007 for housing and community development, and the 2009 Ohio eAward for Excellence in Exporting.and the Governors Award in 2007 for housing and community development.

Moving forward, in 2011 Screen Machine Industries partnered with the US Air Force to deliver equipment to an airbase in Kandahar, Afghanistan. That same year Screen Machine Industries hosted Governor Mitt Romney for a campaign rally. Company President & CEO Steve spoke at the 2012 Republican National Convention.

Aggflow recently added Screen Machine Industries products to their software for use by aggregate engineers. Also, in 2012 the Association of Equipment Manufacturers awarded Screen Machine with the "I Make America" Gold-Level award followed up by achieving the same award in 2013.

Equipment types
 Crushing Plants
Horizontal Shaft Impact Crushers (HSI)
Cone Crushers
 Vibratory Screening Plants
 Spyder Plants
 Scalpers
 Conventional Screens
 Trommel Screens
 Stacking Conveyors

Recent Product Releases
 CST Cone Crusher Released
 JHT Jaw Crusher Released
 Spyder 512T Screen Released
 6036T Tracked Conveyor Released

References

External links
 Company web site

Manufacturing companies of the United States
Manufacturing companies established in 1966
Companies based in the Columbus, Ohio metropolitan area
1966 establishments in Ohio